Phoma glycinicola is a fungal plant pathogen infecting soybean.

See also
 List of soybean diseases

References

External links 
 Index Fungorum
 USDA ARS Fungal Database

Fungal plant pathogens and diseases
Soybean diseases
glycinicola
Fungi described in 2002